Central line or Central Line may refer to:

Railway and metro lines

in English
 Central Line (Cape Town), in South Africa
 Central line (London Underground), in England 
 Central line (Mumbai Suburban Railway), in India
 Central Line (Newark), a former streetcar line in New Jersey, U.S
 Central Line (Sweden), between Sundsvall and Storlien
 Central Line (Tanzania), from Dar es Salaam to Kigoma
 Central Link, now known as the 1 Line, a light rail line running between the cities of Seattle and SeaTac, part of Sound Transit's Link light rail system
 Moscow Central Circle, in Russia

Other languages
 Busan Metro Line 1, also called Jungang Line, in Busan, South Korea
 Chūō Main Line ('Central Main Line'), between Tokyo and Nagoya in Japan
 Chūō Line (Rapid), services on the eastern Chūō Main Line
 Chūō Liner, now Hachiōji, a limited-stop reserved-seat service
 Chūō–Sōbu Line, local services
 Osaka Metro Chūō Line, in Japan
 Jungang line ('Central line'), from Cheongnyangni in Seoul to Gyeongju, in South Korea
 Gyeongui–Jungang Line, in Seoul, South Korea, which operated partially on the Jungang Line

Other uses
 Central Line (band), a British band 1978–1984
 Central line (geometry), certain lines in the plane of a triangle
 Central line (medicine), or central venous catheter
 "Central Line", a song by Squarepusher (credited as the Duke of Harringay) on the album Alroy Road Tracks

See also

 Center line (disambiguation)
 Central subway (disambiguation)
 North–South Line (disambiguation)
 East West Line (disambiguation)
 Main line (disambiguation)
 Trunkline (disambiguation)
 Central Artery, a section of freeway in Boston, Massachusetts, U.S.
 Jungang Expressway, an expressway in South Korea